Chipatá is a town and municipality in the Vélez Province, part of the Santander Department in northeastern Colombia. The municipality borders Vélez in the south and west, La Paz in the north, San Benito, Güepsa and Barbosa in the east.

Etymology 
Chipatá is named after cacique Chipatá and means in Chibcha: chi = "our", pa = "father", tá = "farmland"; "farmland of our father".

History 
The area of Chipatá was one of the northernmost territories of the Muisca, bordered by Guane territories to the north and east. It was ruled by a cacique, who was independent within the loose Muisca Confederation.

Modern Chipatá was the first settlement founded by conquistador Gonzalo Jiménez de Quesada and his brother, on March 8, 1537, during his expedition of conquest.

After the local elections of October 2015, where Belisario Romero Chávez gained the position of mayor with a difference of 44 votes, supporters of his contestant Emilse Santamaría Castillo destroyed a school and molested the former mayor Argemiro Angulo.

Economy 
The main economical activities of Chipatá are agriculture and livestock farming. Among the agricultural products cultivated are maize, coffee, blackberries, pitaya, aloe, and stevia.

References 

Municipalities of Santander Department
Populated places established in 1537
1537 establishments in the Spanish Empire
1537 disestablishments in the Muisca Confederation